The Danish Railway Museum is the national railway museum of Denmark, located in the city of Odense. Established in 1975, it is situated in a former engine shed adjacent to the city's main railway station. It is the largest railway museum in Scandinavia.

Covering 10,000 square metres, it contains some 50 locomotives and railway carriages on 20 railtracks from all periods of Danish rail history, plus some original buildings of Danish railways. Items from DSB's history include an E class steam locomotive used to haul the funeral train of King Frederick IX of Denmark, a NOHAB diesel locomotive (sectioned on one side, to reveal the engine), an original 1930s Copenhagen-area S-train carriage and a 1950s Lyntog ('lightning train') express diesel multiple unit.

In school holidays, the museum also runs a live steam-hauled train on a short section of track. These usually consist of a Class Hs loco and two carriages.

See also
DSB (railway company)
List of museums in Denmark

References

External links 
 

Museums established in 1975
National railway museums
Railway museums in Denmark
Museums in Odense